Ryckmans is a surname, and may refer to:
Hélène Ryckmans (born 1959), Belgian politician
Pierre Ryckmans (1935-2014), Pen name Simon Leys. Belgian-Australian writer and sinologist
Pierre Ryckmans (1891-1959), Belgian civil servant and colonial head of Burundi and Congo

See also
Ryckman
Rickmansworth